Prairie Valley School Division No. 208  comprises 38 schools in 30 communities.  Prairie Valley SD belongs to Region 4, Regina along with  Holy Trinity R.C.S.S.D No. 22, Prairie South School Division No. 210, Regina School Division No. 4, and  Regina R.C.S.S.D No. 81

Amalgamation 
Aspen Grove SD  #144 amalgamated in 2006 with Prairie Valley School Division No. 208.

See also
List of school divisions in Saskatchewan

References

External links
Prairie Spirit School Division No. 206
Prairie Spirit School Division No. 206 map

School divisions in Saskatchewan
Lists of schools in Saskatchewan